Corpse Marker is a BBC Books original novel written by Chris Boucher and based on the long-running British science fiction television series Doctor Who. It features the Fourth Doctor and Leela. The concepts and characters are derived from the 1977 television serial The Robots of Death and reused in the spinoff audio series Kaldor City. It is notable for acting as a crossover story, albeit a slight one, to Blake's 7, which Boucher script-edited, as the Psychostrategist Carnell (who appeared in the series two episode "Weapon" in 1979) plays a prominent role.

Synopsis
The events which took place on the Sandminer were covered up and only three survivors now living in Kaldor City know the truth.  When the robots begin a second murderous spree in the city, the Doctor and Leela must intervene to stop them.

References

1999 British novels
1999 science fiction novels
Past Doctor Adventures
Fourth Doctor novels
Novels by Chris Boucher
BBC Books books